The 1977 Pro Bowl was the NFL's 27th annual all-star game which featured the outstanding performers from the 1976 season. The game was played on Monday, January 17, 1977, at the Kingdome in Seattle, Washington in front of a crowd of 63,214. The final score was AFC 24, NFC 14.

Chuck Noll of the Pittsburgh Steelers led the AFC team against an NFC team coached by Los Angeles Rams head coach Chuck Knox. The referee was Chuck Heberling.

Mel Blount of the Pittsburgh Steelers was named the game's Most Valuable Player. Players on the winning AFC team received $2,000 apiece while the NFC participants each took home $1,500.

Rosters

AFC

NFC

References

External links

Pro Bowl
Pro Bowl
Pro Bowl
Pro Bowl
American football competitions in Washington (state)
Sports competitions in Seattle
January 1977 sports events in the United States
1970s in Seattle
American football in Seattle